Niels Stockfleth Darre (18 February 1765 – 9 October 1809) was a Norwegian military officer.

Darre was born in Fåberg as the son of Major General Michael Darre (1728–1804) and his wife Anna Christine Pram. He married Ellen Aschim.

Niels Stockfleth Darre was hired in the military cadastre authority in 1787, and eventually advanced to leader. In 1807, when the Gunboat War broke out, he was appointed aide-de-camp for the Danish Prince Christian August. In 1808, when the Dano-Swedish War broke out, Darre participated in battles with the rank of Major. On 14 September 1809 at Magnor he negotiated a temporary ceasefire with the Swedish Army. However, he died a few weeks later.

References

1765 births
1809 deaths
Norwegian Army personnel
Norwegian military personnel of the Napoleonic Wars